Service Corporation International is an American provider of funeral goods and services as well as cemetery property and services. It is headquartered in Neartown, Houston, Texas, and operates secondary corporate offices in Jefferson, Louisiana (near New Orleans). SCI operates more than 1500 funeral homes and 400 cemeteries.

Company history 
Robert L. Waltrip founded the company in 1962. SCI began as a small network of funeral homes and cemeteries in the Houston area.

SCI, Alderwoods Group, and Stewart Enterprises emerged from the 1990s as the three largest companies in the industry. On , SCI owned and operated 3,823 funeral service locations, 525 cemeteries, 198 crematoria and two insurance operations located in 20 countries on five continents.

In 1999, SCI also introduced Dignity Memorial.  By unifying its network of funeral homes and cemeteries under one brand name, SCI believed it could establish recognizable and communicable brand values.

It also changed business and sales processes, tightened internal controls following the protocols, strengthened corporate governance standards, and established a new training and development system.

Recent acquisitions 
In 2006, SCI merged with Alderwoods Group, its nearest competitor in terms of size. The Federal Trade Commission (FTC) blocked the merger, citing concerns over consumer choice. After agreeing to divest funeral home and cemetery locations in several markets and end licensing agreements with other funeral homes, the FTC allowed the merger to continue. By 2007, the integration of Alderwoods's locations and operations was complete.

The purchase was completed in 2010 and added about 200 locations.

In May 2013, SCI signed a  deal to purchase Stewart Enterprises, the second-largest death care company. In December 2013, the FTC imposed conditions on the acquisition, requiring the two companies to sell 53 funeral homes and 38 cemeteries in 59 local markets, and requiring the merged company to be subject to a ten-year period during which the FTC will review any attempt by the company to acquire funeral or cemetery assets in those local markets.

Brands 
SCI operates the following brands in the United States and Canada:

 Advantage
 
 
 Dignity Memorial
 Dignity Memorial Premier Collection
 
 LHT Consulting Group, LLC
 Neptune Memorial Reef
 Neptune Society/Trident Society/Neptune Society of Northern California
 National Cremation
 Rose Hills Memorial Park

Notable properties 
 Frank E. Campbell Funeral Chapel in Manhattan, New York City
 Glenwood Memorial Gardens, Broomall, Pennsylvania
 Westwood Village Memorial Park in Westwood, Los Angeles, California
 Pierce Brothers Mortuary in Los Angeles
 Riverside Memorial Chapel in Manhattan, New York City
 Sparkman-Hillcrest Memorial Park Cemetery in Dallas
 Caballero Rivero Woodlawn Park North Cemetery and Mausoleum
 Crown Hill Funeral Home and Cemetery in Indianapolis
 Lake Lawn Metairie Funeral Home and Cemeteries in New Orleans
 Woodlawn Memorial Park Cemetery in Colma, California

Controversies

Costs 
Barrett quoted "data compiled" by a "'concierge' funeral planning service" Everest Funeral Package, which found that for "traditional funerals, SCI charges  on average (excluding casket and cemetery plot), 42 percent more than independents." In reply, SCI points to "overwhelmingly positive responses" on customer surveys, below market wages paid to staff and management, and states they provide "top value" at a variety of funeral price points.

Texas 
In the late 1990s, SCI was involved in a controversy involving alleged violations of Texas State embalming laws. The proceedings took a political slant due to Robert Waltrip's friendship with the family of then-governor George W. Bush and Waltrip's campaign contributions to various members of the Bush family.

Referred to as "Funeralgate" or "Formaldegate" in the media, the controversy was widely publicized when Eliza May, a director with the Texas Funeral Service Commission (TFSC), was fired while investigating SCI. May alleged in a civil suit that she was fired because she refused to halt her investigation despite pressure to do so from Governor Bush.

May's lawyers subpoenaed President Bush to testify at the trial, but Texas judge John K. Dietz threw out the subpoena on the grounds that the then-governor was not in a position to have enough specialized information to require his involvement.

SCI and the state of Texas were required to jointly pay the decision. On , the TFSC fined SCI an additional  for administrative penalties.

Florida 
On January 18, 2023, it was reported on local news that the Escambia County Sheriffs Office was called to investigate a crime of corpse abuse by an employee who was caught in the act, by another employee. The alleged criminal was never charged with the crime because he committed suicide the same day. 
The investigation into the crime and the Oaklawn Funeral Home is still under pending.

In 2001, it was reported that employees of the Memorial Gardens cemetery near Fort Lauderdale, Florida, had oversold the cemetery, so bodies were buried in the wrong places, separating husbands from wives; vaults were cracked open by a backhoe, bodies were exhumed, with bones, skulls and shrouds thrown into nearby woods, bodies were stacked on top of each other, and remains were relocated without notifying relatives.

The allegations were particularly appalling to the Jewish cemetery's more religiously observant customers, The Miami Herald reported. Traditional Jewish law requires bodies to be buried intact and prohibits disturbing the dead. SCI reached a  agreement with the Florida attorney general's office in 2003 that required it to repair plots and reorganize the cemeteries to ensure all graves were properly marked and the grounds could accommodate all plots sold.

Virginia 
Nsombi Hale was filing suit against SCI.

After an internal investigation by SCI, attorneys working for SCI denied the charges against the company in a letter to Virginia funeral regulators, and a few days later, the Post reported that Robert Ranghelli, one of the SCI employees who had corroborated the initial reports of improper handing of corpses, was fired for "exercising his first amendment rights/speaking with the media" after having been on administrative leave for several months following the initial reports in the newspaper.

On , The Washington Post reported that the National Funeral Home, a facility owned by SCI in the Falls Church area of Fairfax County, Virginia, which also acts as a centralized embalming and dressing station for embalming and body preparation for other nearby SCI-owned operations (Arlington Funeral Home, Danzansky-Goldberg Memorial Chapel, and Demaine Funeral Home), was storing naked bodies in various stages of decomposition in conditions described as "disgusting, degrading and humiliating". The story went on to report that as many as 200 bodies were stored on "makeshift gurneys in the garage" and "at least half a dozen veterans destined for the hallowed ground at Arlington National Cemetery were left in their coffins on a garage rack". The Post reported that documentation describing these conditions had been reported to the Virginia Board of Funeral Directors and Embalmers.

A few days later, the Post reported that family members of a deceased Army veteran whose remains were stored in an unrefrigerated garage at National Funeral Home asked the Fairfax County Commonwealth's Attorney to investigate the actions of National and its parent company, SCI, as crimes.

The Post further reported that the family of retired U.S. Army Colonel Andrew DeGraff filed a lawsuit in Fairfax County alleging that SCI mishandled DeGraff's remains. According to the article, an SCI spokesman said that the company is conducting an internal investigation.

California 
On , a class-action lawsuit was filed against SCI and Eden Memorial Park, a Jewish cemetery managed by SCI in Mission Hills charging that they were destroying graves to make room for new interments.

The Los Angeles Times reported that state officials found no evidence of mass grave disturbances. Russ Heimerich, a spokesman for the state Department of Consumer Affairs, said, "We have not seen any evidence of the kind of massive desecration that is being alleged. The kind of activity they're alleging is not easily hidden, especially on a willful, large-scale basis." The plaintiff's attorney rejected the findings of the state's investigation.

Michael Avenatti, the plaintiff's attorney, said more than 800 families have joined the class action suit. Avenatti claims the state's investigation was shoddy, saying, "Investigators from the state were told by various groundskeepers over a year ago that they had been repeatedly told to throw bones away, and yet for some reason, the state didn't adequately follow up."

SCI denied all charges. After the lawsuit was filed, the Consumer Affairs Department reviewed five to six years of the cemetery's annual inspection records and found no indication that graves had been disturbed. According to the Los Angeles Times article, "The agency also asked the dozens of families that contacted officials to look for signs of disturbancesshifted or cracked gravestones or anything else that appeared different from previous visitsand didn't receive a single call back, he said." 

In January 2012, the lawsuit against Eden Memorial Park was ruled to be a valid class action in Los Angeles Superior Court, with the trial scheduled to begin in May 2012.

In 2015, families filed a second suit alleging that the practice continued after the first settlement. The suit remains pending .

Massachusetts 
In 2010, the State Board of Registration charged the SCI-owned Stanetsky Chapel, a Jewish funeral home in Brookline with serious violations of state law and regulations in connection with an incident where a woman was buried in the wrong grave, then disinterred without a legal permit and reburied in the correct grave with the woman's family not being notified of the mistake and the corrective procedure. As a result, in December 2011, the State Board announced a Consent Agreement and levied the biggest fine in its history, against Stanetsky and SCI, and suspended the license of the Stanetsky general manager for a year. Other staff members involved in the incident were subject to punitive actions ranging from additional professional training to license revocation. The incident received widespread local media coverage. The Board's action was also published on its website.

The infant's body was apparently placed on a gurney that held an adult woman's body that was scheduled for cremation. The family's lawyer, Gordon T. Walker, said SCI could be hit with additional costs, as there is a pending claim that the company violated the state's consumer protection law. The jury awarded  because of emotional distress and  because it found the funeral home was negligent and intentionally inflicted emotional harm.

References

External links 

 

American companies established in 1962
Business services companies established in 1962
Companies based in Houston
Companies listed on the New York Stock Exchange
Funeral-related companies